The Virginia Wings were a professional ice hockey team based in Norfolk, Virginia of the greater Hampton Roads area. They were an affiliated farm team of the Detroit Red Wings, and a member of the American Hockey League for three seasons from 1972–73 to 1974–75. The Wings were previously known as the Tidewater Wings for the 1971–72 season. Their cross-state rivals in the AHL were the Richmond Robins.

The Wings won the John D. Chick Trophy as South Division champions of the regular season in 1974–75, which turned out to be their final season. After the Wings ceased operations, the Hampton Gulls would represent eastern Virginia at the AHL level for the 1977–78 season. The Wings franchise was granted suspension status until 1975, and then voluntarily withdrew from the league in 1976.

After the Wings ceased operations, professional hockey returned to the Hampton Roads metropolitan area numerous times:

 Hampton Gulls (1974–1977 SHL), (1977–1978 AHL)
 Tidewater Sharks (1975–1977 SHL)
 Hampton Roads Gulls (1982–1983 ACHL)
 Hampton Roads Admirals of the ECHL (1989–2000)
 Norfolk Admirals of the AHL (2000–15)
 Norfolk Admirals of the ECHL (2015–present)

Yearly results

Playoffs

External links
Virginia Wings - hockeydb.com

Ice hockey teams in Virginia
Sports in Norfolk, Virginia
Defunct American Hockey League teams
Defunct ice hockey teams in the United States
Ice hockey clubs established in 1971
Ice hockey clubs disestablished in 1975
1971 establishments in Virginia
1975 disestablishments in Virginia